Hieracium debile is a forb of genus Hieracium in the family Asteraceae,
and was found only in Ecuador, in two separate collections gathered more than a century ago by W. Jameson.  

Hieracium debile is threatened only by habitat loss and is not known to be living in any protected areas.

References

debile
Flora of Ecuador
Critically endangered plants
Taxonomy articles created by Polbot